Daniel Migneault (born 16 February 1978) is a Canadian snowboarder. He competed in the men's halfpipe event at the 2002 Winter Olympics.

References

1978 births
Living people
Canadian male snowboarders
Olympic snowboarders of Canada
Snowboarders at the 2002 Winter Olympics
People from Baie-Comeau
Sportspeople from Quebec